Poole's Corner Provincial Park is a provincial park in eastern Prince Edward Island, Canada.  It is located southeast of Cardigan and northeast of Montague.

Provincial parks of Prince Edward Island
Parks in Kings County, Prince Edward Island